To Hear Is to See! is an album by saxophonist Eric Kloss which was recorded in 1969 and released on the Prestige label.

Reception

Allmusic awarded the album 4½ stars.

Track listing 
All compositions by Eric Kloss.
 "To Hear Is to See" - 5:32  
 "The Kingdom Within" - 6:01  
 "Stone Groove" - 6:58  
 "Children of the Morning" - 8:27  
 "Cynara" - 9:35

Personnel 
Eric Kloss - alto saxophone, tenor saxophone
Chick Corea - piano, electric piano 
Dave Holland - bass
Jack DeJohnette - drums

References 

1969 albums
Eric Kloss albums
Prestige Records albums
Albums produced by Don Schlitten